The Don Lane Show was an Australian television talk show which aired twice a week on the Nine Network from 1975 to 1983.
The show was created by Don Lane who co-hosted it with Bert Newton.

Channel Nine was reluctant to cast Bert Newton, who had been associated with Graham Kennedy, but Lane insisted that he wanted Newton to do the show.

The theme music of the show, "You Make It So Easy", was written by Helen Reddy.

Legacy 
The show became one of the most popular talks shows in Australian television history. Its broadcast timeslot varied in its early years, including a brief stint in 1980 when it ran four nights a week, but eventually settled on Mondays and Thursdays at 9:30pm on the Nine Network and many stations across Australia. Some regional and remote commercial stations would receive the program on videotape for delayed broadcast. 

The Don Lane Show is the top-rated variety program in Australian television history. Lane was inducted into the Logie Awards hall of fame in 2003.

DVD release

In 2010, a two-disc DVD was released. In 2015, a four-disc version with new covers was released. The DVDs include episodes from 1981 to 1983, including the 1983 bushfire appeal special and the final episode.

References

Nine Network original programming
Australian television talk shows
1975 Australian television series debuts
1983 Australian television series endings